Adam Mohamad El-Abd (born 11 September 1984) is a retired professional footballer who plays as a defender. El-Abd made over 500 first team appearances in his professional career and also played for the Egypt national team.

Early and personal life
Born in Brighton, East Sussex, to an Egyptian father and a British mother, El-Abd holds dual-nationality. His older brother Joe played professional rugby union and is a coach at Castres Olympique. His younger brother Sami was an apprentice at Brighton, before moving to non-League football with Crawley Town, Hayes & Yeading United, Whitehawk, Bognor Regis Town and now plays for Dorking Wanderers.

Club career

Brighton & Hove Albion
El-Abd joined Brighton & Hove Albion's youth department when he was nine and was granted a scholarship there at 16. He signed his first professional contract of two-and-a-half years at the age of 19. He made his full league début for the club in the 2–1 win at Notts County in November 2003. He was then a regular in the first team squad, playing either in defence at right-back or centre-half, or in a more defensive midfield role.

During the game at Huddersfield Town on 18 March 2008, El-Abd was stretchered off with medial collateral ligament damage and ruled out for the remainder of the season.

In June 2008, El-Abd signed a new two-year deal with Brighton. He won the Seagulls Player of the Season award for their League One winning 2010–11 campaign.

El-Abd hit the milestone of 250 league appearances for Brighton on 7 March 2012, named Man of the Match in a 2–2 draw with Cardiff City. El-Abd made his 300th and final league appearance for the Seagulls coming on as a 90th-minute substitute against Birmingham City on 11 January 2014.

Bristol City
On 16 January 2014, El-Abd transferred to League One club Bristol City for an undisclosed fee. Rarely used at Bristol City, he spent time out on loan at Bury, Swindon Town, and Gillingham.

Shrewsbury Town
After his contract at Bristol City expired, he moved to League One club Shrewsbury Town on a free transfer in July 2016, signing a two-year contract, where he immediately became captain in place of the departed Nathaniel Knight-Percival. He scored his first goal for the club in a 2–1 home victory against Chesterfield on 20 August, but was sent off in a 2–1 defeat at former club Bury three weeks later. After the departure of Shrewsbury manager Micky Mellon, El Abd scored a "30 yard half-volley" in a 1–1 draw away at Southend United on 29 October, to hand new boss Paul Hurst a point in his first match in charge.

El-Abd left the club at the end of June 2017 after his contract was cancelled by mutual consent.

Wycombe Wanderers
On 3 July 2017, El-Abd signed a two-year contract with League Two side Wycombe Wanderers. In May 2018 he extended his contract for a further year, to the end of the 2019–20 season. El-Abd left Wycombe on 2 September 2019 by mutual consent.

Stevenage
He signed for Stevenage on 6 September 2019, but was released by the Hertfordshire side at the end of the 2019–20 season having made just 4 appearances in all competitions.

Whitehawk
El-Abd joined Whitehawk on 5 August 2020, firstly as player-assistant manager, then as a player and assistant U18 coach for the 2021-22 season, before leaving at the end of the season.

Worthing
On 8 June 2022, El-Abd joined newly promoted National League South club Worthing, linking up with former Brighton teammate Adam Hinshelwood, now Worthing manager.

International career
El-Abd stated in a 2005 interview with EgyptianPlayers.com that he intended to play for the Egyptian national side if he got the call.

On 15 May 2012, and for the first time, Egypt national team coach Bob Bradley included El-Abd in the squad for friendly games against Cameroon, Togo, and Senegal, and also against Mozambique in a FIFA World Cup Qualifier.

Career statistics

Footnotes

a. appearances in the Football League Trophy.
Bognor Regis Town statistics unavailable

Honours
Brighton & Hove Albion
Football League One: 2010–11
Individual

 Brighton & Hove Albion Player of the Season: 2010–11

References

External links

1984 births
Living people
Footballers from Brighton
English footballers
Egyptian footballers
Egypt international footballers
Brighton & Hove Albion F.C. players
Bognor Regis Town F.C. players
Bristol City F.C. players
Bury F.C. players
Swindon Town F.C. players
Gillingham F.C. players
Shrewsbury Town F.C. players
Wycombe Wanderers F.C. players
Stevenage F.C. players
Whitehawk F.C. players
Worthing F.C. players
English Football League players
Isthmian League players
English people of Egyptian descent
Association football defenders